"Bad Boy" is a song by American rappers Juice Wrld and Young Thug. It was released via Grade A Productions through exclusive licensing to Interscope Records on January 15, 2021. The two artists wrote the song along with its sole producer, Pi'erre Bourne.

Background 
In November 2019, Juice Wrld posted via Instagram, with the caption "Great things coming". Scenes with frequent music video collaborator Cole Bennett and Young Thug were revealed as well.

On December 25, 2020, Bennett revealed, after much anticipation, that "Bad Boy" and its supported visuals would be released on January 15, 2021. He also revealed that it was the final filmed collaboration between himself and Juice Wrld.

The song was released on January 15, 2021, and it marks the rappers' fourth official collaboration. The song is also the first official collaboration between Juice Wrld and Pi'erre Bourne.

Composition 
On the track, Juice Wrld and Young Thug rap about their reckless lifestyles and liken themselves to Will Smith and Martin Lawrence, the main cast of the 1995 comedy film, Bad Boys.

Music video 
The music video, directed by Cole Bennett, released on January 15, 2021, coincided with the release of "Bad Boy". It marks the final music video filmed with Higgins, as well as the eighth (tenth counting "Tell Me U Luv Me" with Trippie Redd), which uses archival footage of Higgins and marks the final music video collaboration between Higgins and Bennett. The music video was filmed on Chicago's West side on October 25, 2019, just a little over a month before Juice WRLD's death in December 2019.

Credits and personnel 
Credits adapted from Tidal.

 Jarad Higgins – vocals, songwriting, composition
 Jeffery Williams – vocals, songwriting, composition
 Pi'erre Bourne – songwriting, composition, production
 A "Bainz" Bains – studio personnel, engineering
 Max Lord – studio personnel, engineering, mixing
 Simon Alex – studio personnel, mixing
 Ben Lidsky – studio personnel, assistant mixer
 Colin Leonard – studio personnel, mastering

Charts

Certifications

References

External links 
 

2021 singles
2021 songs
Juice Wrld songs
Young Thug songs
Songs written by Juice Wrld
Songs written by Pi'erre Bourne
Songs written by Young Thug
Songs released posthumously
Music videos directed by Cole Bennett
Interscope Records singles